Erwin Sumser  (8 October 1891 – 22 January 1961) was a German physician. He was born and grew up in Merzhausen where he came to know the Schönberg and to appreciate the multitude of orchids growing there. In 1931 he purchased several  floristically valuable lots of land in the Jennetal which are called Sumser's Garden. Later he bought also comparable lots of land on the Baar. In 1960 he sold all his private nature reserves to the federal state of Baden-Württemberg.

Bibliography
Kuhn, Benno, Weshalb das Naturschutzgebiet Jennetal auch Sumsergarten genannt wird (why the nature reserve Jennetal is also called Sumser's garden), in: Ebringer Dorfgeschichten, volume 1, pp. 1-8, Ebringen 2008

Physicians from Baden-Württemberg
German conservationists
1891 births
1961 deaths